Ticino is a village located in the General San Martín Department in the Province of Córdoba in central Argentina.

References

Swiss-Argentine culture
Populated places in Córdoba Province, Argentina
Populated places established in 1911
1911 establishments in Argentina